Gerlache or Gerlach may refer to:
People
 Adrien de Gerlache (1866 — 1934), Belgian polar explorer
 Étienne Constantin de Gerlache (1785 — 1871), first Belgian prime minister
 Gaston de Gerlache (1919 — 2006), Belgian polar explorer
 Saint Gerlach (died c. 1170), Dutch hermit

Places
 69434 de Gerlache, asteroid
 Cape Gerlache, Antarctica
 De Gerlache (crater), lunar crater
 De Gerlache Seamounts, Antarctica
 Gerlache Inlet, Antarctica
 Gerlache Island, Antarctica
 Gerlache Strait, Antarctica
 Mount Gaston de Gerlache, Antarctica
 Mount Gerlache, Antarctica
 Pic de Gerlache, NE Greenland